Euphyia unangulata, the sharp-angled carpet, is a moth of the family Geometridae. It shares its common name with the similarly coloured Neoarctic, Euphyia intermediata.

Description
The wingspan is 25–28 mm. The forewing has a brownish central band. The white outer edge of this band is sharply angled. There is also a narrow white line in the basal area of the forewings. There are two dark discal spots in the central area of the band.The larva is purplish brown with a variety of black and white square spots along the back. It has rather short bristles.

Distribution
It is found from most of Europe across the Palearctic to Japan and the Kamchatka Peninsula.

Behaviour
Adults are on wing from mid April to August. There are two generations per year.

The larvae feed on Stellaria species, including Stellaria media. Larvae can be found from June to September. The species overwinters as a pupa.

Subspecies
Euphyia unangulata unangulata 
Euphyia unangulata gracilaria (Bang-Haas, 1906)
Euphyia unangulata tonnaichana (Matsumura, 1925)
Euphyia unangulata renei (Bryk, 1948) (Kamchatka, northern Kurils)

External links

UK Moths
Fauna Europaea
Lepiforum.de

Euphyia
Moths of Japan
Moths of Europe
Taxa named by Adrian Hardy Haworth
Geometridae
Insects of Japan
Moths described in 1809